This article lists persons and politicians who have been appointed as the Minister of Home Affairs in Indonesia.

References

Bibliography

Lists of political office-holders in Indonesia
Interior ministers of Indonesia